Acrotaenia is a genus of tephritid  or fruit flies in the family Tephritidae.

Species
Acrotaenia latipennis (Wiedemann, 1830) — Brazil
Acrotaenia otopappi Doane, 1899 — Mexico
Acrotaenia spadix Bates, 1934 — Cuba, Haiti, Dominican Republic
Acrotaenia tarsata Wulp, 1899 — Mexico, Belize
Acrotaenia testudinea (Loew, 1873) — United States (Florida), Greater Antilles
Acrotaenia trisignata Foote, 1960 — The Bahamas

References

Tephritinae
Tephritidae genera
Taxa named by Hermann Loew
Diptera of South America
Diptera of North America